Stryjeńskich Street is one of the three main thoroughfares of Warsaw's borough of Ursynów. It links Płaskowickiej Street on the north with Wąwozowa Street on the west. The name commemorates the Stryjeński family: Zofia, Aleksander, Karol and Tadeusz. The street was planned in the 1970s and opened ten years later – the name of the avenue appears on the Warsaw maps in 1980. The name of the street was given in 1977. Nowadays, it crosses local streets: Przy Bażantarni, Małej Łąki, Moczydłowska, Belgradzka, Kazury and Na Uboczu.

In 2015, the street was designed to be blinkered to the only pass in the both directions (on the length from Przy Bażantarni to Belgradzka Streets). It was also said that two zebra crossings will be prepared. The project, which was lodged in the Participatory budgeting, caused controversies and was rejected by the authorities of Ursynów. Nearby the street there are located: the local park Moczydełko, two churches and one primary school (in the vicinity of the cross with the Na Uboczu Street).

References

Streets in Warsaw
Ursynów